Flores (Portuguese for "Flowers") is a municipality (município) in the state of Pernambuco in Brazil. The population is 22,618 (2020 est.) in an area of 996 km².

Geography

 Boundaries - Paraiba state and Quixaba  (N);  Betânia  (S);  Carnaíba and Custódia  (E);  Triunfo and Calumbi  (W)
 Elevation - 466 m
 Hydrography - Pajeú River
 Vegetation - Caatinga hiperxerófila.
 Clima - Semi desertic ( Sertão) hot and dry
 Annual average temperature - 25.0 c
 Distance to Recife - 385 km

Economy

The main economic activities in Flores are based in agribusiness, especially creation of cattle and their milk, goats, sheep and plantations with beans, corn and guava (goiaba).

Economic Indicators

Economy by Sector

Health Indicators

References

Municipalities in Pernambuco